Batozonellus is a genus of the spider hunting wasps (insects belonging to the family Pompilidae).

Description
The species of the genus Batozonellus range from large to very large. Body is black and yellow. The compound eyes are large. Clypeus is short and broad. The wings are yellow. The tip of the forewing has a brownish band. The pterostigma is quite small. The tibiae have long spines. The females dig their nests in the ground and supply larvae with spiders of the family Araneidae.

Species
The species in the genus are:
Batozonellus aliciae (Bingham, 1896) 
Batozonellus annulitarsis (Cameron, 1891) 
Batozonellus bipunctatus Banks, 1941 
Batozonellus exiguus Banks, 1947 
Batozonellus gundlachi (Cresson, 1865) 
Batozonellus ichneumonoides Banks, 1944 
Batozonellus inornatus Banks, 1945 
Batozonellus madecassus (Saussure, 1887) 
Batozonellus marcidus Banks, 1925 
Batozonellus multipictus (Smith, 1879) 
Batozonellus navus Briml., 1936 
Batozonellus orientalis (Cameron, 1891) 
Batozonellus pentodon Arlé, 1947 
Batozonellus separabilis (Turner, 1916) 
Batozonellus submaculatus Banks, 1934 
Batozonellus tricolor Turner, 1916 
Batozonellus vespoides Turner, 1916 
Batozonellus willistoni Banks, 1944

Some species formerly placed within the genus Batozonellus have been assigned to the genus Parabatozonus by some authorities, including the type species of the genus, Batozonellus fuliginosus. If this classification is to be followed then a new type species will have to be designated for Batozonellus. The species reclassified under Parabatozonus are:

Batozonellus annulatus (Fabricius, 1793)
Batozonellus bioculatus (Bingham, 1896)
Batozonellus bracatus (Bingham, 1890)
Batozonellus fuliginosus (Klug, 1834)
Batazonus lacerticida (Pallas, 1771)
Batozonellus maculifrons (Smith, 1873) — species studied for its venom Pompilidotoxin
Batozonellus sareptanus (Tournier, 1889)
Batozonellus truchmenus (Morawitz, 1888)
Batozonellus unifasciatus (Smith, 1855)

Distribution and habitat
These wasps can be found in most of Europe. They colonize predominantly open habitats and forest edges. Under newer studies the genus Batozonellus sensu stricto is found only in Africa and Australia, and Parabatozonus is found in Europe, Asia and Africa.

References

Pompilinae
Hymenoptera genera